Aidoneus is a genus of lace bugs in the family Tingidae. There is at least one described species in Aidoneus, A. dissimilis.

References

Further reading

 
 
 
 
 
 
 
 
 
 
 

Tingidae
Articles created by Qbugbot